Kenton Jermaine Keith (born July 14, 1980) is a former American football running back. He was signed by the Saskatchewan Roughriders of the Canadian Football League (CFL) in 2003 and then the Indianapolis Colts of the National Football League (NFL) in 2007. He played college football at New Mexico State.

Keith was also a member of the New York Jets of the (NFL), Hamilton Tiger-Cats of the (CFL) and Omaha Nighthawks of the United Football League (UFL).

Early years
Keith played high school football at Omaha Benson High School, averaging better than 28 yards per carry as a junior and better than 18 yards per carry as a senior.
Keith will be inducted into his high schools Hall of Fame soon for breaking the rushing title in only two years of playing.

College career
Kenton then attended New Mexico State University rushing for 2,134 yards over four seasons.
Keith also led the nation in yards per carry his Junior year with an 8.5-yard average

Professional career

Saskatchewan Roughriders
Keith signed with the Saskatchewan Roughriders in 2001. 
In four CFL seasons, he ran for more than 3,800 yards, topped 1,000 yards
twice, caught 52 passes and had eight TD receptions in 2003.  Keith's best CFL season came in 2004, when he gained 1,154 yards in 14 games—a number which approaches the 1,500-yard plateau over a full 18-game schedule. If you calculate his yardage from 2003 and 2005 in the same manner, neither total falls under 1,200. In the spring of 2004, he signed with New York Jets then returned to the CFL where he was a West Division All-Star in 2006.

Indianapolis Colts
Keith signed with the Indianapolis Colts in early 2007.
He was a second string running back for the Indianapolis in 2007, backing up feature back Joseph Addai. Keith had his first 100-yard rushing game against the Tampa Bay Buccaneers in a 33–17 win with the Colts. 
Keith ran for 533 yards and scored four touchdowns as Addai's backup.

Hamilton Tiger-Cats
Keith was signed by the Hamilton Tiger-Cats on September 22, 2008.
Suffered an injury to his LCL and was released.

Omaha Nighthawks
Keith was signed by the Omaha Nighthawks on June 10, 2011. This was the Lock-Out year in the NFL, then the NightHawks folded.

Personal
Kenton's father Percy Keith played college football at the University of Nebraska-Lincoln (1976–1980). Keith is also cousins with former NFL running back Roger Craig and current NFL running back Breece Hall.

References

External links
Just Sports Stats

1980 births
Living people
American football running backs
American players of Canadian football
Canadian football running backs
Hamilton Tiger-Cats players
Indianapolis Colts players
New Mexico State Aggies football players
New York Jets players
Omaha Nighthawks players
Sportspeople from Lincoln, Nebraska
Players of American football from Nebraska
Saskatchewan Roughriders players
African-American players of Canadian football
21st-century African-American sportspeople
20th-century African-American people